This is a list of all the notable places in Muzaffargarh City and its surroundings.

Administrative Division
 Muzaffargarh District
 Alipur Tehsil
 Chowk Sarwar Shaheed
 Jatoi Tehsil
 Kot Addu Tehsil
 Muzaffargarh Tehsil

Villages and localities
 Allama Iqbal Town
 Faqirwala
 Gamoon wala
 Jalalabad
 Jatoi
 Khangarh
 Khar
 Kot Addu
 Meerwala
 Mehmood Kot
 Qasba Gujrat
 Rohilanwali
 Sanawan
 Seet pur

Monuments
 Yadgar Club

Hospitals
 Recep Tayyip Erdoğan Hospital

Colonial Buildings
 Yadgar Club
 Chenab West Bank railway station
 Muzaffargarh railway station
 Kotla Laghari Halt railway station (Closed)
 Budh railway station
 Mahmud Kot railway station
 Gurmani railway station
 Sanawan railway station
 Kot Adu Junction railway station
 Dera Dinpanah railway station
 Ashanpur railway station
 Hamdaniwala Halt railway station

Railway Stations
 Chenab West Bank railway station
 Muzaffargarh railway station
 Kotla Laghari Halt railway station (Closed)
 Budh railway station
 Mahmud Kot railway station
 Gurmani railway station
 Sanawan railway station
 Kot Adu Junction railway station
 Dera Dinpanah railway station
 Ashanpur railway station
 Hamdaniwala Halt railway station
 Lal Mir Halt railway station
 Lal Pir railway station

Historical Forts
 Shah Garh Fort 
 Ghazanfargarh Fort

Mausoleums

 Gous Pak

Cultural heritage sites in Muzaffargarh

Protected sites 
 Tomb of Tahir Khan Nahar

Unprotected Sites 
 Fort of Mahmood Kot

Mosques
 Jamia Sakeena-Tu-Sughra - Jatoi

Education Institutions

Government Colleges 
There are about two dozen Government colleges in Muzaffargarh District۔

Schools 
 The Educators

Sports
 Faisal Stadium

Parks and Gardens
 Fayyaz Park
 Nawab Muzaffar Khan Park

Constituencies

See also
 List of roads in Muzaffargarh
 List of places in Multan
 List of places in Lahore
 List of places in Faisalabad

References

External links

Muzaffargarh
Buildings and structures in Muzaffargarh
Muzaffargarh
Muzaffargarh